During the 1983–84 season Associazione Sportiva Roma competed in Serie A, Coppa Italia and European Cup.

Summary 
During summer the club transferred in Brazilian midfielder Toninho Cerezo from Atletico Mineiro and Forward Francesco Graziani from Fiorentina. Head coach Nils Liedholm changed the defensive style after the crucial transfer out of Centre-back Pietro Vierchowod to Sampdoria a loan ended. Another key player in midfielder Carlo Ancelotti was injured in early December during match against Juventus and he lost the rest of the season. The squad finished the campaign at the 2nd spot only behind Champion Juventus.

Meanwhile, in European Cup First round the team defeated IFK Goteborg with an aggregate score of 4–2, after that the squad eliminated in Eightfinals CSKA Sofia and in Quarterfinals Dinamo Berlin. The semifinals against Scottish club Dundee United: after lost the first leg 2-0 the Giallorosso win 3–0 in Roma reaching the Final of the tournament. The match against three-time European Cup Champion and heavily favourite Liverpool, though played in its home venue Stadio Olimpico, finished won by the English squad after a penalty shoot-out series: with the Giallorosso squad could not play two crucial players such as Maldera, and Carlo Ancelotti.

Meanwhile, during June the squad won the Coppa Italia, after defeated the upcoming underdogs Hellas Verona: the last trophy for Swedish manager Nils Liedholm, who was appointing by Giuseppe Farina as new head coach of A.C. Milan for the next season along with the transferred out of midfielder and Captain Agostino Di Bartolomei.

Squad

Transfers

Winter

Competitions

Serie A

League table

Position by result

Matches

Coppa Italia

First round - Group 5

Eightfinals

Quarterfinals

Semifinals

Finals

European Cup

First round

Eightfinals

Quarterfinals

Semifinals

Final

Statistics

Squad Statistics

Player statistics

References

External links

See also 
 
 

A.S. Roma seasons
Roma